Tian Congming (May 1943 – 26 December 2017) was a Chinese politician who served as director of the State Administration of Radio, Film and Television from 1998 to 2000, president of Xinhua News Agency from 2000 to 2008, and chairperson of the Ethnic and Religious Affairs Committee of the Chinese People's Political Consultative Conference from 2008 to 2013.

He was a representative of the 14th, 15th, 16th, and 17th National Congress of the Chinese Communist Party. He was a member of the 14th and 15th Central Commission for Discipline Inspection. He was a member of the 16th Central Committee of the Chinese Communist Party. He was a member of the Standing Committee of the 11th Chinese People's Political Consultative Conference.

Biography
Tian was born in Fugu County, Shaanxi, in May 1943. His father died early and he was brought up by his mother. In 1965 he was accepted to Beijing Normal University and joined the Chinese Communist Party (CCP) in December of that same year. After graduation in 1970, he stayed at the university.

In April 1972, he became an official in Bayannur League, Inner Mongolia, and joined the Inner Mongolia Branch of Xinhua News Agency in October 1975. He was appointed secretary for the General Office of the CCP Inner Mongolia Autonomous Regional Committee in March 1980, concurrently serving as deputy director of the Policy Research Office of the CCP Inner Mongolia Autonomous Regional Committee. He was appointed secretary-general of the CCP Inner Mongolia Autonomous Regional Committee in March 1983 and was admitted to member of the Standing Committee of the CCP Inner Mongolia Autonomous Regional Committee, the region's top authority. He was elevated to deputy party secretary of the region in January 1987.

In December 1988, he was transferred to southwest China's Tibet Autonomous Region and appointed deputy party secretary. 

In October 1990, he became deputy director of Ministry of Radio, Film and Television (later reshuffled as State Administration of Radio, Film and Television), rising to director in March 1998. He was president of Xinhua News Agency in June 2000, and held that office until April 2008. He was also president of All-China Journalists Association from October 2006 to November 2016. In March 2008, he took office as chairperson of the Ethnic and Religious Affairs Committee of the Chinese People's Political Consultative Conference, and served until March 2013.

On 26 December 2017, he died from an illness in Beijing, at the age of 74.

References

1943 births
2017 deaths
People from Yulin, Shaanxi
Beijing Normal University alumni
People's Republic of China politicians from Shaanxi
Chinese Communist Party politicians from Shaanxi
Members of the 16th Central Committee of the Chinese Communist Party
Members of the Standing Committee of the 11th Chinese People's Political Consultative Conference